The Bogue Chitto River is a stream in the U.S. states of Louisiana and Mississippi. It is a tributary of the Pearl River.

The river passes through the Bogue Chitto State Park in Washington Parish, Louisiana.

Bogue Chitto is a name derived from the Choctaw language meaning "big creek". Variant names are "Barrio del Buck Chitto", "Bogachito River", and "Bogue Chito".

References

Rivers of Louisiana
Rivers of St. Tammany Parish, Louisiana
Rivers of Washington Parish, Louisiana
Rivers of Mississippi
Rivers of Lincoln County, Mississippi
Rivers of Pike County, Mississippi
Rivers of Walthall County, Mississippi
Tributaries of the Pearl River (Mississippi–Louisiana)
Mississippi placenames of Native American origin
Louisiana placenames of Native American origin